The American Jewish Museum, or AJM, is a contemporary Jewish art museum located in Pittsburgh, Pennsylvania.  A department of the Jewish Community Center (JCC) of Greater Pittsburgh, the museum is located in the Squirrel Hill JCC at the corner Forbes Avenue and Murray Avenue, in the heart of Pittsburgh's historically Jewish neighborhood.  The museum was founded in 1998, and though it does not have a permanent collection, it hosts several original and traveling exhibitions each year.  The AJM aims to explore contemporary Jewish issues through art and related programs that facilitate intercultural dialogue.

History
Prior to 1998, the JCC of Greater Pittsburgh had a small community gallery for nearly 25 years.  Under the auspices of Leslie A. Golomb, the gallery underwent a period of substantial growth, evolving into a museum and receiving accreditation from the Council of American Jewish Museums (CAJM).  Accreditation by CAJM requires strict adherence to standards regarding archives, catalogues, and curating, as well as educational programs and outreach.

Today, the AJM galleries are still located on the Pittsburgh JCC's Squirrel Hill campus.  While the AJM continues to emphasize the Pittsburgh community in its exhibitions and programming, its scope has grown as it collaborates with regional, national, and international artists and organizations.  Additionally, the AJM frequently explores Jewish themes such as contemporary iterations of rituals, but aims to reach the wider community though exhibits with broad appeal and programming that encourages interfaith discourse.

Recent Exhibitions
As a non-collecting museum, the AJM works with local, national, and international artists to create original exhibitions, and occasionally hosts traveling exhibitions from institutions such as the United States Holocaust Memorial Museum. Here is a list of recent, notable exhibitions:
2017: Hill District Paintings. Rochelle Blumenfeld
2011: Legacy. A Painter's Legacy: The Students of Samuel Rosenberg (artist)
2010: Between Heaven and Earth. Ilene Winn Lederer
2010: To Speak Her Heart. Leslie A. Golomb and Barbara Broff Goldman
2010: India: A Light Within. Charlee Brodsky
2010: I Thought I Could Fly. Charlee Brodsky
2009: Tempted, Misled, Slaughtered: The Short Life of Hitler Youth, Paul B. Presented through the Florida Holocaust Museum
2009: Body of Work: Philip Mendlow
2008-2009: Love/Fences/Nests. Ally Reeves, Ben Schacter, Anna Divinsky
2007-2008: Nazi Persecution of Homosexuals. Presented through the United States Holocaust Memorial Museum
2007: Of the Painted Image. Miriam Cabessa, Seth Cohen, Peter Rostovsky
2007: If My Eyes Speak. Adam Nadel
2006: Body in Diaspora. Maritza Mosquera 
2006: 118-60 Metropolitan Avenue. Joan Linder
2004-2005: The Mikvah Project. Janice Rubin and Leah Lax
2004: QuilkLinks. Louise Silk and Pittsburgh teens
2003: From Home to Home: Jewish Immigration to America. Presented through the Children's Galleries for Jewish Culture (formerly the Jewish Children's Learning Lab)
2001: Encountering the Second Commandment. International group exhibition of 43 artists from eight countries

References

External links 
 

Museums in Pittsburgh
Jewish museums in the United States
Jews and Judaism in Pittsburgh
Ethnic museums in Pennsylvania
Art museums and galleries in Pennsylvania
Modern art museums in the United States
Art museums established in 1998
1998 establishments in Pennsylvania